CYL can refer to: 

 Cylindrospermopsin, a cyanotoxin produced by a variety of freshwater cyanobacteria
 Leung Chun-ying, Chinese politician from Hong Kong
 Communist Youth League of China, the youth wing of the Chinese Communist Party
 Wawrzyniec Cyl, a Polish footballer

See also
 Cyl (disambiguation)
 CYN